Ajyyhyt (Aysyt, Ajsyt or Ajyhyt) is a fertility deity of the Yakut people from the Lena River region of Siberia. The name means "birthgiver" and may also be called the "Mother of Cradles". Her full name is given as Айыыһыт Хотун, meaning "Birthgiving nourishing mother". Aisyt brings the soul from heaven at the birth of a baby and records each one in the Golden Book of Fate and daughter of Yer Tanrı.

Role
Ajysyt was responsible for conducting the soul of a newborn child to its birth and attended every birth. Women would channel Ajysyt, believing that doing so would relieve them of pain during childbirth. She kept a golden book in which she recorded each one. She is said to have lived on a mountain top in a house with seven stories, from which she controlled the fate of the world.

Versions
The primary manifestation, Ньэлбэй Айыыһыт (Njelbey Ajyhyt), is responsible for the birth of children; Дьөһөгөй Тойон (Djøhøgøj Tojon) govern the reproduction of horses; Иhэгэй Иэйиэхсит (Ihegej Iejehsit) has responsibility for oxen; and Noruluya manages dogs and foxes. 

When referring to the fertility deity for the births of male animals, such as stallions or bulls, the word  is understood to be male. However, when relating to the birth of a mare or cow, the word is feminine.

Legends
One legend recalls how she appeared from the roots of the Cosmic Tree (alternatively the world pillar of Үрүҥ Аар Тойон (Yryng Aar Tojon) to a pale young man; the tree stood beside a lake of milk. By suckling the youth she caused his strength to increase a hundredfold.

Contemporary representation

Ajysyt is a featured figure on Judy Chicago's installation piece The Dinner Party, being represented as one of the 999 names on the Heritage Floor.

References

Yakut mythology
Earth goddesses
Eurasian shamanism

Altai culture